Maglić is transboundary mountain, on the border of Bosnia and Herzegovina and Montenegro.

The mountain is oriented in a northwest–southeast direction.

Geography

Maglić is the highest mountain in Bosnia and Herzegovina. It is bounded by the river Sutjeska to the west, the Piva to the east-southeast and the Upper Drina to the north-northeast, with Vučevo plateau extending to the north.

Karst limestone formations in the region of limestone plateau are the general geological setting in the south and southwest region.

Maglić massif consists of two peaks namely, the Veliki Maglić on the Bosnia and Herzegovina side and the Crnogorski Maglić on the Montenegrin side, which is  higher. The Montenegrin part of Maglić massif has formed the Trnovačko Jezero (Trnovačko Lake), said to be "one of the most beautiful of Montenegro." The lake is drained from the Maglić, the Volujak and the Bioč hill ranges. The north side of the lake which is open has the wooded Vratnice. The lake water has green-blue colour. The headwaters of Sutjeska River are in the canyon parts of Maglić Mountain. The mountain is bounded by the Sutjeska river on the north and west, by the Volujak mountain on the southwest, by the Drina River and Piva River on the east and by the Mratinjska Uvala valley on the south. It presents a challenging climb.

The rich forests on the mountainside consist of the Perućica forest, a protected reserve within the Sutjeska National Park, which is the oldest and one of the two last remaining primeval forests in Europe. The northwestern slope has thick coniferous and beech trees up to elevation , while in the other directions the hill slopes are very steep, barren and rocky. Pastures are found at elevations above  in the plateaus. The mountain peak is accessible through the park and is visited by mountaineers and nature lovers. Most of the routes to the peak require two days of hiking. Mountaineering access to the summit of the Maglić massif is only from the southern side, which has rich vegetation of grass and mountain pine. From the top of the peak, are scenic vistas of Volujak, Bioč, Trnovačko Lake, Durmitor (in Montenegro), apart from the Bosnian mountains in the north and northwestern direction which can be seen.

Protection
Maglić is important feature of the Sutjeska National Park, which is the first national park within Bosnia and Herzegovina, established in 1962. The park is drained by the Sutjeska River, running through the valley of Tjentište.

See also
Dinaric Alps

References

External links

 Maglic hiking map

Mountains of Bosnia and Herzegovina
Mountains of Montenegro
Bosnia and Herzegovina–Montenegro border
International mountains of Europe
Two-thousanders of Bosnia and Herzegovina
Two-thousanders of Montenegro
Highest points of countries